Mojave beardtongue or Mojave penstemon is a common name for several plants and may refer to:

Penstemon incertus, with blue to purple flowers
Penstemon pseudospectabilis, with red to pink flowers